Dubovany is a village and municipality in Piešťany District in the Trnava Region of western Slovakia.

History
In historical records the village was first certainly mentioned in 1279 as Luchunch, earlier 1113 the charters of the Zobor Abbey refer to villa Lucinci.

Geography
The municipality lies at an altitude of 158 metres and covers an area of 11.337 km2. It has a population of about 935 people.

Genealogical resources

The records for genealogical research are available at the state archive "Statny Archiv in Bratislava, Slovakia"

 Lutheran church records (births/marriages/deaths): 1783-1922 (parish B)

See also
 List of municipalities and towns in Slovakia

References

External links

  Official page
https://web.archive.org/web/20071027094149/http://www.statistics.sk/mosmis/eng/run.html
Surnames of living people in Dubovany

Villages and municipalities in Piešťany District